Liverpool Everton by-election may refer to:

 Liverpool Everton by-election, 1892
 Liverpool Everton by-election, 1905

See also
 Liverpool Everton (UK Parliament constituency)